High Point is an unincorporated community in King County, in the U.S. state of Washington.

High Point, on the eastern fringe of Issaquah, is named for its location at the highest point on a railroad grade. Once the location of a significant lumber mill  and railway station, it is now only a small collection of houses on large lots along I-90 at the "High Point Way" exit, and a Tiger Mountain trailhead.

History
High Point was founded by Jason Lovegreen in 1905, and a post office was established in 1910, which operated until its closure in 1943.

A lumber mill once existed at High Point, which employed 52 workers in 1913. Many of the state-owned timberlands near High Point continue to produce logs for mills elsewhere to this day, while also being open for recreational use.

Modern Day
High Point was the location of Tent City 4 beginning in early 2016, while the camp was awaiting a permit to move to Bellevue.  Today, High Point consists of a small collection of houses, state forest access roads and a Tiger Mountain trailhead at a minor exit on Interstate 90 east of Issaquah.

References

 

Unincorporated communities in King County, Washington
Unincorporated communities in Washington (state)